Largs Thistle Football Club are a Scottish football club, based in the town of Largs, North Ayrshire. Nicknamed The Theesel, they were formed in 1889 and play at Barrfields Park. Their main rivals are Beith Juniors and Kilbirnie Ladeside.

The team are managed since October 2016 by Stuart Davidson, who stepped up from his assistants role following the resignation of previous manager Bryan Slavin.

History
In the 1993–94 season, Largs Thistle lifted the Scottish Junior Cup beating Glenafton Athletic 1–0 in the final at Ibrox Stadium on 15 May 1994. Largs won the match in front of 8,000 spectators and claimed their first Scottish Junior Cup.

In the 2009–10 season, Largs again reached the final of the Scottish Junior Cup, however this time losing 1–0 to Linlithgow Rose at Rugby Park on 23 May 2010. The following season Largs achieved their highest position in the West Premier Division by finishing fifth place. Largs' third appearance in the Scottish Junior Cup final came in 2018-19, when they lost 0-2 to Auchinleck Talbot at New Douglas Park on 2 June 2019.

Recent seasons

Stadium
Barrfields Park has been the home of Largs Thistle F.C. since 1930. The stadium first opened on 21 July 1930, with crowds of over 9,000 attending the first scheduled events. The surface was upgraded to an all-weather 3G pitch in August 2012.

Current squad

Non-playing staff

Notable former players
  Gordon McQueen - Scotland, Leeds United, Manchester United, St Mirren
  Tommy Turner - St Mirren, Partick Thistle, St Johnstone, Greenock Morton, Gretna
  Jimmy Frizzell - Greenock Morton, Oldham Athletic
  Phil Bonnyman - Rangers, Hamilton Academical, Carlisle United, Chesterfield, Grimsby Town
  Crawford Boyd - Queen of the South, Hearts
  Derek Grierson - Queen's Park, Rangers, Falkirk, Arbroath
  Tommy Halliday - Dumbarton, Cardiff City, Stranraer
  William Kinniburgh - Motherwell, Ayr United, Partick Thistle, Clyde
  Phil Cannie - Greenock Morton, Clyde
  Davie Elliott - Ayr United, Dumbarton, East Fife
  Jackie Rafferty - Dumbarton, Partick Thistle
  Dougie McCracken - Ayr United, Dumbarton, East Fife
  Johnny McIntyre - Clydebank
  Ryan McWilliams - Greenock Morton, East Stirlingshire
  Steve Morrison - Dunfermline Athletic, Dumbarton, Clyde, Alloa Athletic, Clydebank, East Stirling
  Rashid Sarwar - Kilmarnock
  Kenny Meechan - Dumbarton
  Andrew Kean
  Craig Brown - Greenock Morton, Port Glasgow
  Joe Knowles - Perth Glory
  Joel Kasubandi - Greenock Morton

Notable former managers and coaches
  Phil Bonnyman - Rangers, Hamilton Academical, Carlisle United, Chesterfield, Grimsby Town
  Erik Sørensen - Denmark, Rangers, Greenock Morton
  Jim George - Dumbarton, St Johnstone, East Fife
  Bobby Lawrie - Partick Thistle, Stranraer
  David McKellar - Derby County, Carlisle United, Hamilton Academical, Rangers
  Bryan Slavin - Greenock Morton
  Stephen Swift - Cowdenbeath, Linlithgow Rose, Stranraer, Irvine Meadow, BSC Glasgow
  Tom Spence - Stirling Albion, East Fife, Albion Rovers

Honours

Scottish Junior Cup
Winners: 1993–94
Runners-up: 2009–10, 2018–19

SJFA West Super League First Division
Winners: 2008–09
Runners-up: 2015–16

West Region Ayrshire League
Winners: 2004–05

West of Scotland Cup
Winners: 1990–91

Ayrshire Weekly Press Cup
Winners: 2012–13

Other Honours
Ayrshire Second Division winners: 1983–84, 1993–94, 2001–02
North Ayrshire Cup: 2005–06
Ardrossan & Saltcoats Herald Cup: 1922–23, 1956–57, 1958–59
Western League North Division: 1955–56
Ayrshire League (Kerr & Smith) Cup: 1924–25, 1957–58
Ayrshire District (Irvine Times) Cup: 1895–96, 1956–57

References

External links
 Largs Thistle FC Official Website
 
 

 
Football clubs in Scotland
Scottish Junior Football Association clubs
Football in North Ayrshire
Association football clubs established in 1889
Largs
1889 establishments in Scotland
West of Scotland Football League teams